Pădurenii may refer to several villages in Romania:

 Pădurenii, a village in Tisău Commune, Buzău County
 Pădurenii, a village in Mintiu Gherlii Commune, Cluj County
 Pădurenii, a village in Tritenii de Jos Commune, Cluj County